The Macintosh Quadra 610, originally sold as the Macintosh Centris 610, is a personal computer designed, manufactured and sold by Apple Computer from February 1993 to July 1994. The Centris 610 was introduced alongside the larger Centris 650 as the replacement for the Macintosh IIsi, and it was intended as the start of the new midrange Centris line of computers. Later in 1993, Apple decided to follow an emerging industry trend of naming product families for their target customers Quadra for business, LC for education, and Performa for home and folded the Centris 610 into the Quadra family.

The 610 is the second Macintosh case design (after the Macintosh LC family) to use a pizza box form factor; it was later used for the Centris / Quadra 660AV and the Power Macintosh 6100. The Quadra 610 was also sold in a "DOS compatible" model with an additional 486SX processor at 25 MHz on a Processor Direct Slot card.

A server variant, the Workgroup Server 60, was introduced in July 1993 with a 20 MHz processor, which received the same 25 MHz upgrade in October. A "DOS Compatible" version was introduced in February 1994 as a way for Apple to judge whether the market would be interested in a Macintosh that could also run DOS. The product was deemed a success by Apple, selling all 25,000 units that were produced in two months.

The Quadra 610 was replaced with the Quadra 630 in July 1994, and the Workgroup Server 6150 replaced the Workgroup Server 60 as Apple's entry-level server offering.

Hardware 
Standard equipment on all Centris 610 models includes onboard video (with VGA support via an adapter), two ADB and two serial ports, and an external SCSI connector. There are two SIMM slots that support 4, 8, 16, and 32 MB SIMMs, allowing for a 68 MB of RAM. Ethernet-capable models have an AAUI port. There are no NuBus slots; an optional expansion card was offered that plugs into the Processor Direct Slot and allows a single 7-inch NuBus card to be installed in a horizontal orientation. This arrangement initially precluded the use of the full 68040 processor as there was insufficient clearance for a heat sink, something the 68LC040 does not require. This was no longer an issue by the time the Quadra 610 DOS Compatible was released, which included a full 68040 CPU.

When the Centris 610 was first introduced, only a few 7-inch NuBus cards existed; most were 12 inches. The smaller size was part of an upcoming update to the NuBus standard.

System 7.1 was included as standard, with Mac OS 8.1 being the highest supported version. Versions with a full 68040 processor can also run A/UX with the appropriate Enablers.

Models 
Introduced February 10, 1993:
 Macintosh Centris 610: Sold in four configurations:
 68LC040, 4 MB RAM (onboard), 512 KB VRAM (onboard), 80 MB HDD, no Ethernet
 68LC040, 8 MB RAM (4 MB onboard + 4 MB SIMM), 512 KB VRAM (onboard), 80 MB HDD, Ethernet
 68LC040, 8 MB RAM (4 MB onboard + 4 MB SIMM), 512 KB VRAM (onboard), 230 MB HDD, Ethernet
 68LC040, 8 MB RAM (4 MB onboard + 4 MB SIMM), 1 MB VRAM (512 KB onboard + 512 KB SIMM), 230 MB HDD, Ethernet, AppleCD 300i and microphone

Introduced July 26, 1993:
 Workgroup Server 60: 68040 at 20 MHz, 8 MB ram (onboard), 250 or 500 MB HDD. The 500 MB model was sold for US$2,699 as of early 1994.

Introduced October 21, 1993:
 Macintosh Quadra 610: 68LC040 or 68040 at 25 MHz, 160 or 230 MB HDD.

Introduced February 28, 1994:
 Macintosh Quadra 610 DOS Compatible: 68040 at 25 MHz, 160 or 230 MB HDD; the DOS card occupies the PDS slot and includes an Intel 486SX-25 and has a 72-pin SIMM slot which supports up to 32 MB RAM.

Timelines

References

External links

 Centris 610, Quadra 610 and Quadra 610 DOS compatible at Low End Mac
 Centris 610, Quadra 610, and Workgroup Server 60 at EveryMac.com

610
610
Quadra 610
Quadra 610
Quadra 610
Quadra 610
Computer-related introductions in 1993